Purdue may refer to:

Purdue University, a land-grant, public university in West Lafayette, Indiana, United States
Purdue Boilermakers, the athletic program of Purdue University
Purdue University System, a public university system within the state of Indiana, centered on the West Lafayette campus
Purdue Pharma, a US pharmaceuticals company

People
Charlotte Purdue (born 1991), British long-distance runner
Connie Purdue (1912–2000), New Zealand trade unionist and Labour Party activist, who then became a conservative Catholic and anti-abortion activist
Frank Purdue (1899–1985), Australian politician and Commander of the Order of the British Empire
John Purdue (1802–1876), American industrialist and primary original benefactor of Purdue University
Phil Purdue (fl. 1990s–2010s), Irish rugby footballer
John Purdue Gray, physician and co-founder of eponymous predecessor of Purdue Pharma

See also

Perdue (disambiguation)